Susanna Fournier is a Canadian actress and playwright  whose roles include Grace in I'll Follow You Down  and Zoe Gonzalez in Being Human.

Writing

Fournier is one of the writers of Lulu v. 7: Aspects of a Femme Fatale, produced in Toronto in 2018.

Awards
Susanna Fournier won the 2018 Patrick Conner Award.

Filmography
 Being Human
 Still Life: A Three Pines Mystery 2013 
 I'll Follow You Down 2013
 X-Men: Days of Future Past 2014
 12 Monkeys 2015
 Journey Back to Christmas 2016
 Shadowhunters 2016

References

External links

Canadian film actresses
Living people
Year of birth missing (living people)